An egg cream is a cold beverage consisting of milk, carbonated water, and flavored syrup (typically chocolate or vanilla), as a substitute for an ice cream float. Despite the name, the drink contains neither eggs nor cream.

It is prepared by pouring syrup into the tall glass, adding milk, lightly stirring it with a spoon, then streaming soda water into the glass, mixing the other ingredients. Ideally, the glass is left with 2/3 liquid and 1/3 foamy head.

The egg cream is almost exclusively a fountain drink. Although there have been several attempts to bottle it, none have been wholly successful, as its refreshing taste and characteristic head require mixing of the ingredients just before drinking.

Etymology theories and speculations

The peculiarity that an egg cream contains neither eggs nor cream has been explained in various ways. Stanley Auster, who claims that his grandfather invented the beverage, has said that the origins of the name are "lost in time."

The egg cream originated among Yiddish-speaking Eastern European Jewish immigrants in New York City, so one explanation claims that egg is a corruption of the Yiddish  'genuine or real', making an egg cream a "good cream".

Food historian Andrew Smith writes: "During the 1880s, a popular specialty was made with chocolate syrup, cream, and raw eggs mixed into soda water. In poorer neighborhoods, a less expensive version of this treat was created, called the Egg Cream (made without the eggs or cream)."

His heavy accent altered the name into something like "egg cream," which then developed into the current term.

See also
Italian soda
Dirty soda
 List of chocolate beverages

References

External links

National Egg Cream Day @ eggcreamday.com
 (Radio episode)

American drinks
Jewish American cuisine
Chocolate drinks
Jewish cuisine
Cuisine of New York City
Milk-based drinks
Historical foods in American cuisine